Kochi, also known as Cochin (the official name until 1996) is a major port city on the Malabar Coast of India bordering the Laccadive Sea, which is a part of the Arabian Sea. It is part of the district of Ernakulam in the state of Kerala and is commonly referred to as Ernakulam. Kochi is the most densely populated city in Kerala. As of 2011, it has a corporation limit population of 677,381 within an area of 94.88 km2 and a total urban population of more than of 2.1 million within an area of 440 km2, making it the largest and the most populous metropolitan area in Kerala. Kochi city is also part of the Greater Cochin region and is classified as a Tier-II city by the Government of India. The civic body that governs the city is the Kochi Municipal Corporation, which was constituted in the year 1967, and the statutory bodies that oversee its development are the Greater Cochin Development Authority (GCDA) and the Goshree Islands Development Authority (GIDA). The current metropolitan limits of Kochi include the mainland Ernakulam, Fort Kochi, the suburbs of Edapally, Kalamassery, Aluva and Kakkanad to the northeast; Tripunithura to the southeast; and a group of islands closely scattered in the Vembanad Lake. 

Called the "Queen of the Arabian Sea", Kochi was an important spice trading centre on the west coast of India from the 14th century onward, and maintained a trade network with Arab merchants from the pre-Islamic era. In 1505, the Portuguese established trading ports in Cochin. There are still buildings like the Old Harbour House from this period, some of which have been renovated in more recent times. The Kingdom of Cochin allied with the Ming Dynasty, Portuguese, and Dutch and  became  a princely state of the British. Kochi ranks first in the total number of international and domestic tourist arrivals in Kerala. The city was ranked the sixth best tourist destination in India according to a survey conducted by the Nielsen Company on behalf of the Outlook Traveller magazine. In October 2019, Kochi was ranked seventh in Lonely Planet's list of top 10 cities in the world to visit in 2020. Kochi was one of the 28 Indian cities among the emerging 440 global cities that will contribute 50% of the world GDP by 2025, in a 2011 study done by the McKinsey Global Institute. In July 2018, Kochi was ranked the topmost emerging future megacity in India by global professional services firm JLL. Kochi is the first city in India to have a water metro project.

Kochi is known as the financial, commercial and industrial capital of Kerala. It has the highest GDP as well as the highest GDP per capita in the state. The city is home to the Southern Naval Command of the Indian Navy and is the state headquarters of the Indian Coast Guard with an attached air squadron, named Air Squadron 747. Commercial maritime facilities of the city include the Port of Kochi, an International Container Transshipment Terminal, the Cochin Shipyard, offshore SPM of the BPCL Kochi Refinery and the Kochi Marina. Kochi is home for the International Pepper Exchange, Marine Products Export Development Authority, Coconut Development Board, companies like HMT, Apollo Tyres, FACT, IREL, Petronet LNG, Kochi Refineries, V-Guard and industrial parks like the Cochin Special Economic Zone, Smart City, Infopark and Kinfra Hi-Tech Park. Kochi is home for the High Court of Kerala and Lakshadweep, Naval Physical and Oceanographic Laboratory, Indian Maritime University, Sree Sankaracharya Sanskrit University and the Cochin University of Science and Technology, and National University of Advanced Legal Studies. Kochi was earlier home to Cochin Stock Exchange (CSE).

Kochi has been hosting India's first art biennale, the Kochi-Muziris Biennale, since 2012, which attracts international artists and tourists.

Etymology
Ancient travellers and tradesmen referred to Kochi, variously alluding to it as Cocym, Cochym, Cochin, and Kochi. The Cochin Jewish community called Cochin Kogin, which is seen in the seal of the synagogue owned by the community. The Arab merchants called this place Kashi, which is seen in the books such as Tuhfat Ul Mujahideen. The origin of the name Kochi is thought to be the Malayalam word kochu azhi, meaning 'small lagoon'. Accounts by Italian explorers Nicolo Conti (15th century), and Fra Paoline in the 17th century say that it was called Kochchi, named after the river connecting the backwaters to the sea. After the arrival of the Portuguese, and later the British, the name Cochin stuck as the official appellation. The city reverted to a closer transcription of its original Malayalam name, Kochi, in 1996. This change in name was challenged by the city municipal corporation but court later dismissed the plea.

History

Muziris, a port somewhere north of Kochi (mostly identified with Kodungallur in Thrissur district), was the centre of Indian spice trade for many centuries, and was known to the Arabs, Yavanas (Greeks and Romans) as well as Jews, Syrians, and Chinese since ancient times. Kochi rose to significance as a trading centre after the port Muziris around Kodungallur (Cranganore) was destroyed by the massive flooding of Periyar in 1341. The earliest documented references to Kochi occur in books written by Chinese voyager Ma Huan during his visit to Kochi in the 15th century as part of Admiral Zheng He's treasure fleet. There are also references to Kochi in accounts written by Italian traveller Niccolò Da Conti, who visited Kochi in 1440. The ruler of Perumpadappu (near Ponnani) fled to Kodungallur in the early medieval period, when the Zamorin of Calicut annexed Ponnani region, after Tirunavaya war. They later moved to Kochi and established the Kingdom of Cochin. When Vasco Da Gama landed at Kozhikode and the Zamorin of Calicut fought against the Portuguese with Kunjali Marakkar, the ruler of Cochin aligned with the Portuguese. 

On the Malabar coast during the early 15th century, Calicut and Kochi were in an intense rivalry, so the Ming dynasty of China decided to intervene by granting special status to Kochi and its ruler known as Keyili (可亦里) to the Chinese. Calicut had been the dominant port-city in the region, but Kochi was emerging as its main rival. For the fifth Ming treasure voyage, Admiral Zheng He was instructed to confer a seal upon Keyili of Kochi and enfeoff a mountain in his kingdom as the Zhenguo Zhi Shan (鎮國之山, Mountain Which Protects the Country). Zheng He delivered a stone tablet, inscribed with a proclamation composed by the Yongle Emperor himself, to Kochi. As long as Kochi remained under the protection of Ming China, the Zamorin of Calicut was unable to invade Kochi and a military conflict was averted. The cessation of the Ming treasure voyages consequently had negative results for Kochi, as the Zamorin of Calicut would eventually launch an invasion against Kochi. In the late 15th century, the Zamorin occupied Kochi and installed his representative as the king of the port-city.

According to many historians, the precursor state to Kingdom of Kochi came into existence in the early 12th century, after the fall of the Chera Kingdom. The reign of the Kingdom was hereditary, and the family that ruled over the region was known as the Perumpadappu Swaroopam in the local vernacular.

The port at Kozhikode held superior economic and political position in medieval Kerala coast, while Kannur, Kollam, and Kochi, were commercially important secondary ports, where the traders from various parts of the world would gather. The Portuguese arrived at Kappad Kozhikode in 1498 during the Age of Discovery, thus opening a direct sea route from Europe to India. Portuguese navigator, Pedro Álvares Cabral founded the first European settlement in India at Kochi in 1500. From 1503 to 1663, Fort Kochi (Fort Emmanuel) was ruled by Portugal. This Portuguese period was a harrowing time for the Saint Thomas Christians, Muslim Mappilas, and the Jews, as the Inquisition was active in Portuguese India. The ruler of the Kingdom of Tanur, who was a vassal to the Zamorin of Calicut, sided with the Portuguese, against his overlord at Kozhikode. As a result, the Kingdom of Tanur (Vettathunadu) became one of the earliest Portuguese Colonies in India. The ruler of Tanur also sided with Cochin. Many of the members of the royal family of Cochin in 16th and 17th centuries were selected from Vettom. However, the Tanur forces under the king fought for the Zamorin of Calicut in the Battle of Cochin (1504).  However, the allegiance of the Mappila merchants in Tanur region still stayed under the Zamorin of Calicut. Kochi hosted the grave of Vasco da Gama, the first European explorer to set sail for India, who was buried at St. Francis Church until his remains were returned to Portugal in 1539. The Portuguese rule was followed by that of the Dutch who renamed Fort Immanuel as Fort Stormsburg. In meantime, the Royal Family of Kochi relocated the capital of Kochi Kingdom to Thrissur, leaving nominal authority over Islands of Kochi. In 1664, Fort Kochi Municipality was established by Dutch, making it the first municipality in Indian subcontinent, which got dissolved when Dutch authority got weaker in the 18th century. The remaining part of Kochi were governed by governors of Kochi Kingdom. By 1773, the Mysore ruler Hyder Ali extended his conquest in the Malabar region to Kochi forcing it to become a tributary of Mysore. The hereditary Prime Ministership of Kochi held by the Paliath Achans ended during this period.

Meanwhile, the Dutch, fearing an outbreak of war on the United Provinces, signed the Anglo-Dutch Treaty of 1814 with the United Kingdom, under which Kochi was ceded to the United Kingdom in exchange for the island of Bangka, east of Sumatra. However, there are evidences of English habitation in the region even before the signing of the treaty. In 1866, Fort Kochi municipality was reinstalled. Fort Kochi, which was a part of Malabar District until 1956, was made a municipality on 1 November 1866,  along with Kannur, Thalassery, Kozhikode, and Palakkad, according to the Madras Act 10 of 1865 (Amendment of the Improvements in Towns act 1850) of the British Indian Empire. Its first Municipal Council seating contest was conducted in 1883. In 1896, H.H. Rama Varma XV, The Maharaja of Cochin, initiated local administration by forming town councils in Mattancherry and Ernakulam. In 1907, the Governor of the Madras Presidency, Sir Arthur Lawley and his brother, Beilby Lawley, 3rd Baron Wenlock, Governor of Madras, 1891 to 1896, left for an official tour of Cochin and Travancore, which lasted from 25 January to 14 February. On 26 January, they were met by His Highness the Rajah of Cochin who gave a State Dinner in their honour at Ernakulam. By the 1870s, the capital of Kochi Kingdom was relocated again to Kochi Suburb of Tripunithura. In 1910, Ernakulam became the administrative capital of Kochi Kingdom with establishment of Royal Secretariat and State Durbar. The offices of the Diwan and High court were soon moved into Ernakulam.

In 1925, Kochi legislative assembly was constituted due to public pressure on the state. Towards the early 20th century, trade at the port had increased substantially, and the need to develop the port was greatly felt. Harbour engineer Robert Bristow was brought to Kochi in 1920 under the direction of Lord Willingdon, then the Governor of Madras. In a span of 21 years, he transformed Kochi as one of the safest harbours in the peninsula, where ships berthed alongside the newly reclaimed inner harbour equipped with a long array of steam cranes.

In 1947, when India gained independence from the British colonial rule, Cochin was the first princely state to join India willingly.
In 1949, Travancore-Cochin state came into being with the merger of Cochin and Travancore. The King of Travancore was the Rajpramukh of the Travancore-Cochin Union from 1949 to 1956. Travancore-Cochin, was in turn merged with the Malabar district of the Madras State. Finally, the Government of India's States Reorganisation Act (1956) inaugurated a new state—Kerala—incorporating Travancore-Cochin (excluding the four southern Taluks which were merged with Tamil Nadu), Malabar District, and the taluk of Kasargod, South Kanara. On 9 July 1960 the Mattancherry council passed a resolution—which was forwarded to the government—requesting the formation of a municipal corporation by combining the existing municipalities of Fort Kochi, Mattancherry, and Ernakulam. The government appointed a commission to study the feasibility of the suggested merger. Based on its report, the Kerala Legislative Assembly approved the corporation's formation. On 1 November 1967, exactly eleven years since the establishment of the state of Kerala, the Kochi Municipal Corporation came into existence. The merger leading to the establishment of the corporation, was between the municipalities of Ernakulam, Mattancherry and Fort Kochi, along with that of the Willingdon Island, four panchayats (Palluruthy, Vennala, Vyttila and Edappally), and the small islands of Gundu and Ramanthuruth.
The Kochi and Ernakulam districts formed on 1 April 1958 carving areas of the erstwhile Travancore-Kochi-Malabar regions. A major portion of the district is from the Kochi kingdom.

The city's economic growth gathered momentum after economic reforms in India introduced by the central government in the early 1990s. Since 2000, the service sector has energised the city's economy. The establishment of several industrial parks based on IT and other port based infrastructure triggered a construction and realty boom in the city. Over the years, Kochi has witnessed rapid commercialisation, and has today grown into the commercial hub of Kerala.

Geography and climate

Geography 
Over the years, the city has expanded considerably outside the corporation limit set in 1967, although the official city limits hasn't yet been increased. The city straddles the backwaters, encompassing the northern end of a peninsula, several islands and a portion of the mainland. To the west lies the Laccadive Sea, and to the east is the urbanised region in the rest of the mainland area. Much of Kochi lies at sea level, with a coastline of 48 km.

The current metropolitan limits of Kochi include the mainland Ernakulam, Fort Kochi, the suburbs of Edapally, Kalamassery, Aluva and Kakkanad to the northeast; Tripunithura to the southeast; and a group of islands closely scattered in the Vembanad Lake. The state government and the GCDA have plans to include Mala and Kodungallur in Thrissur district, Angamaly, Perumbavoor, Piravom and Kolenchery in Ernakulam district, Thalayolaparambu and Vaikom in Kottayam and Cherthala in Alappuzha district within Kochi metropolitan limits. The newly formed metropolis would be put under the charge of a new authority called Kochi Metropolitan Regional Development Authority. However, The Hindu reported that the state government is yet to take any concrete steps in this regard.

Soil consists of sediments such as alluvium, teris, brown sands, etc. Hydromorphic saline soils are also found in the areas surrounding the backwaters.

Predominant rock types found here are Archaean-basic dykes, Charnockites and Gneisses. An ecologically sensitive area, the Mangalavanam Bird Sanctuary is located in the central part of the city. It has a wide range of mangrove species and is a nesting ground for a vast variety of migratory birds.

Kochi's water needs are entirely dependent on ground water and the two rivers flowing through the district viz., Periyar and Muvattupuzha. Periyar serves the entire northern part of the city whereas Muvattupuzha river under the JnNurm project covers the western part.

Climate
Under the Köppen climate classification, Kochi features a tropical monsoon climate (Am). Kochi's proximity to the equator along with its coastal location results in little seasonal temperature variation, with moderate to high levels of humidity.
From June to September, the south-west monsoon brings in heavy rains as Kochi lies on the windward side of the Western Ghats. From October to December, Kochi receives lighter (yet significant) rain from the northeast monsoon, as it lies on the leeward side.

Civic administration

The city is governed by the Kochi Corporation, headed by a mayor. For administrative purposes, the city is divided into 74 wards, from which the members of the corporation council are elected for five years. Earlier; Fort Kochi, Mattancherry and Ernakulam were the three Municipalities in Cochin area, which was later merged to form the Cochin Corporation. The corporation has its headquarters in Ernakulam, and zonal offices at Fort Kochi, Mattancherry, Palluruthy, Edappally and Pachalam. The general administration of the city is handled by the Personnel Department and the Council Standing committee Section. Other departments include that of town planning, health, engineering, revenue and accounts. The corporation is also responsible for waste disposal and sewage management. The city produces more than 600 tons of waste per day and a large portion of waste is decomposed at Brahmapuram Solid Waste plant into organic manure. The supply of potable water, sourced from the Periyar River is handled by Kerala Water Authority with support of Water works department of Kochi Corporation. Electricity is provided by the Kerala State Electricity Board.
The GCDA and GIDA are the government agencies initiating and monitoring the development of Greater Cochin area, mainly in developing infrastructure facilities for the city.

Law and order
Kochi is the seat of High Court of Kerala, the highest judicial body in the state of Kerala. The Kochi City Police is headed by a Police Commissioner, an Indian Police Service (IPS) officer. The city is divided into five zones and each zone under a circle officer. Apart from regular law & order, the city police comprises the Traffic Police, Narcotics Cell, Riot horse, Armed Reserve Camps, District Crime Records Bureau and a Women's Police station. It operates 19 police stations functioning under the Home Ministry of Government of Kerala. An anti-corruption branch of the Central Bureau of Investigation also operates out of the city. CISF maintains 3 squadrons for providing security to various central and state heavy industries, airport and seaport zones. Other major central agencies are NIA, DRI and Indian Customs due to the presence of major port. According to National Crime Records Bureau (NCRB), Kochi reported significant increase of 193.7 per cent IPC crimes in 2010 compared to 2009, and reported a crime rate of 1,897.8 compared to the 424.1 in whole Kerala. However, the city police commissioner defended that in major crimes such as murders and kidnapping, the city registered a low crime rate even behind other cities in the state.

Politics
Kochi is part of the Ernakulam Lok Sabha constituency in Indian Parliament. The current elected Member of Parliament representing the constituency is Hibi Eden of Indian National Congress. The Ernakulam Lok Sabha constituency elects seven members to the state Legislative Assembly, one each from Ernakulam, Kalamassery, Kochi, Paravur, Thrikkakara, Thrippunithura and Vypin.

Economy

Kochi is widely referred to as the financial and commercial capital of Kerala. Federal Bank, the fourth-largest Private-sector bank in India is located in Aluva which is a suburb of Kochi. Being a major online trading centre in the country, Kochi has a newly opened SEBI office.

Availability of electricity, fresh water, long coastline, backwaters, good banking facilities, presence of a major port, container trans-shipment terminal, harbour terminal and an international air terminal are some of the factors which accelerated the industrial growth in the city and its adjoining district. In recent years the city has witnessed heavy investment, thus making it one of the fastest-growing second-tier metro cities in India. Sales tax income generated in the Kochi metropolitan area contributes heavily to state revenue.

The district contributes 15.1% of the state GDP. Construction and manufacturing industries combined contributes 37% of the district's total GDP, and trade, tourism and hospitality industries together provides another 20%. Major business sectors include construction, manufacturing, shipbuilding, transportation/shipping, seafood and spices exports, chemical industries, information technology (IT), tourism, health services, and banking. Kochi is recognised as one of the seventeen major industrial cities of India by the World Bank Group. However, in the 2009 rankings of ease to start and operate a business, among the 17 Indian cities selected, Kochi was rated as the second most difficult city to start business and was ranked 16th, above Kolkata.

As in most of Kerala, remittances from non-resident Indians (NRI)s is a major source of income. Fertilisers and Chemicals Travancore Limited (FACT), one of the oldest fertilizers and chemical industry in Kerala is located in Kochi. Kochi Refineries of (BPCL) at Ambalamugal is the largest state owned refinery in India. Petronet India has now almost completed Kochi LNG Terminal, for importing and storing natural gas, for energy and fueling needs. Central Government establishments like the Coconut Development Board, the Coir Board and the Marine Products Export Development Authority (MPEDA) have head offices located in the city.

Kalamassery which is situated around 16.5 km from the City Center is one of the major Industrial areas. Leading factories like FACT, HMT and IT/Biotechnology park like KINFRA Hi-Tech Park are located here. The Cochin University of Science and Technology is located at Kalamassery.
Irimpanam is another major industrial area in Kochi. The Seaport-Airport Road (SPAP Road) passes through this place and oil giants like Indian Oil Corporation, Bharat Petroleum and Hindustan Petroleum have plants here.

Like elsewhere in Kerala, tourism is one of the major contributors of the local economy. Ernakulam district, in which Kochi is situated, ranks first in the total number of domestic tourists visiting Kerala, and thus contributes to the economy of the city. The tourist enclave at Fort Kochi and presence of several historical monuments, museums etc. as well as natural attractions like the Vembanad lake and the backwaters attract large number of tourists to the city. Presence of several leading hospitality brands have been a major source of employment for locals. The Kochi Port is one of the leading ports where international cruisers call on regularly. The city has the first marina facility in the country, Kochi Marina which attracts large number of yacht-totters.
Real Estate industry is also one industry which is contributing a lot to the economy of Kochi. Many players have entered the market and have developed residential properties.
Kochi is the headquarters of the Southern Naval Command, the primary training centre of the Indian Navy. The Cochin Shipyard, contributes to the economy of the city. The fishing harbour at Thoppumpady is a minor fishing port in the state and supplies fish to local and export markets. To further tap the potential of the all-season harbour at Kochi, an international cruise terminal was also constructed.

Exports and allied activities are also important contributors to the city's economy. The Cochin Port currently handles export and import of container cargo at its terminal at Willingdon Island. The International Container Transshipment Terminal operating out of Vallarpadam, is India's largest transshipment terminal.
Cochin Port Trust also planning to build an Outer Harbour near Puthuvype. Kochi's historical reliance on trade continues into modern times, as the city is a major exporter of spices and is home to the International Pepper Exchange, where black pepper is globally traded. The Spices Board of India and World Spice Organisation are headquartered in Kochi.

The IT and ITES related industries are growing up in Kochi. Availability of cheap bandwidth through undersea cables and lower operational costs compared to other major cities in India, has been to its advantage. Various technology and industrial campuses including the government promoted InfoPark, Cochin Special Economic Zone and KINFRA Export Promotion Industrial Park operate in the outskirts of the city. Several new industrial campuses are under construction in the suburbs of the city. SmartCity at Kakkanad is one of the prominent projects. Cyber City at Kalamassery is another integrated IT township SEZ being planned in the private sector.

Kochi has an established electronics hardware industry with companies such as V-Guard Industries, OEN India Limited, FCI OEN Connectors and SFO Technologies.

The Cochin International Airport is in the process of setting up an aerotropolis at Nedumbassery.

Transport

Air
It is the first international airport in India to be built without Central Government funds and is the world's first fully solar energy powered airport.

The Cochin airport provides direct connectivity to popular international destinations in the Middle East, Malaysia, Thailand and Singapore and to most major Indian cities apart from tourist destinations like Lakshadweep. Kochi is also the headquarters of the Air India Express service. It is also the fourth busiest airport in India in terms of international passenger traffic, and seventh busiest overall.

Road
Kochi is well connected to neighbouring cities and states via several highways. It is a node in the North-South Corridor of the National Highway system. The road infrastructure in Kochi has not been able to meet the growing traffic demand and hence traffic congestion is a major problem in the city.

Kochi is served by National Highway 66, National Highway 544, National Highway 966A and National Highway 966B.

Several state highways also connect Kochi with other parts of Kerala. SH 15, Ettumanoor-Ernakulam Road, connects the city to Kottayam, Pala, Kumily, Changanacherry, Pathanamthitta etc. SH 41, Palarivattom-Thekkady Road, provides a corridor to the eastern parts of the district. SH 63, Vypeen Pallipuram Road and SH 66, Alappuzha – Thoppumpady road are coastal roads that serve the narrow sliver of land between the backwaters and the sea.

The main arterial roads of the city are the Mahatma Gandhi Road and Sahodaran Ayyappan Road in Ernakulam, constructed in 1925 & 1962 respectively which runs parallel & perpendicular to the coast and having the proposed Metro Rail connectivity. The Seaport-Airport Road is another major road and connects the Cochin Seaport to the Cochin International Airport. The Infopark Expressway in Kakkanad is connected to the Seaport-Airport Road and stretches all the way to Infopark. Other major roads include Chittoor Road, Banerji Road, Shanmugham Road, Kochi Bypass, Kaloor-Kadavanthra Road, Park Avenue etc. A new ring road is proposed for Kochi city by the state government for which a project study is being currently undertaken by NATPAC.

Public transport

Road
The primary form of public transport within the city is largely dependent on privately owned bus networks. The state-run also operates its services in the city through the Thirukochi service. The major bus terminals in the city are Ernakulam Town, Ernakulam Jetty and the private bus terminal at Kaloor. An integrated transit terminal namely The Mobility Hub at Vytilla is under second phase of construction. The terminal acts as a hub for long-distance bus services away from the city centre, and also a converging point for different modes of public transport, namely bus, metro and ferry.

Kochi is one of the few cities to be granted the new-generation air-conditioned low-floor and non-air-conditioned semi-low-floor buses under the JNNURM city transport development project. KURTC and private buses operate frequent schedules to neighbouring areas of Nedumbassery, Perumbavoor, Aluva, Muvattupuzha, Kothamangalam, Cherthala and Poochakkal. Taxis and auto rickshaws (called autos) are available for hire throughout the day.

Development of road infrastructure not keeping pace with the increase in traffic is a major problem faced by Kochi, like most other parts of Kerala.

Rail
The city has four major railway stations – Ernakulam Junction, Ernakulam Town (locally known as the South and North railway stations respectively), Aluva, Angamaly and Tripunithura followed by smaller stations, Edapally and Kalamassery. There is also the Cochin Harbour Terminus providing rail connectivity to the southern segment of the Port of Kochi. The terminus is currently under renovation for the suburban rail networks in the city. The main rail transport system in Kochi is operated by the Southern Railway Zone of Indian Railways, and comes under Thiruvananthapuram Railway division. The South station is one of the busiest railway stations in South India, with more than 128 scheduled train services daily. The North station situated on the northern side of the city, caters mostly to long-distance services that bypass the South station, and also is an additional halt station for many trains.

There is also a historic station named as Ernakulam Terminus(station code:ERG) situated behind the High Court. Great personalities like Mahatma Gandhi and The British Viceroy have visited Cochin through this old railway station. Ernakulam Terminus was the first station to serve the city but had to be abandoned in the early 1960s. Now this station operates as a goods depot of Southern Railway.

Metro

The Kochi Metro is a metro rapid transit system serving the city of Kochi, intended to considerably ease traffic congestion in the city and its surrounding metropolitan area. The Phase-1 of the metro system will have 22 stations connecting the suburban towns of Aluva and Pettah while passing through downtown.
The first half of the Phase-1 of Kochi Metro was inaugurated on 17 June 2017 by Indian Prime Minister Narendra Modi. Currently Kochi Metro is operational from Aluva till Maharaja's College along the Kalamassery - Edappally - Kaloor - MG Road stretch, covering a total of 18.4 km with 16 operational metro stations.

Water

Kochi ranks among India's major seaports, partly due to being one of the safest harbours in the Indian Ocean. The port, administered by a statutory autonomous body known as the Cochin Port Trust, offers facilities for bunkering, handling cargo and passenger ships and storage accommodation. The port is a complex of three islands, one of which is man-made.

It also operates passenger ships to Colombo and Lakshadweep. Boat services are operated by Kerala Shipping and Inland Navigation Corporation, the State Water Transport Department and private firms from various boat jetties in the city. The junkar ferry for the transshipment of vehicles and passengers between the islands are operated between Ernakulam and Vypin, and between Vypin and Fort Kochi. However, with the construction of the Goshree bridges (which links Kochi's islands), ferry transport has become less essential. The main boat jetties are Ernakulam Main Boat Jetty near Park Avenue, High Court Jetty in Banerjee Road, Embarkation Jetty in Willingdon Island and Fort Kochi Jetty. In December 2021, Kochi became India’s first city to have a water metro project. The integrated transport system connects 10 islands of Kochi through a network of 15 routes that span 76km and 38 jetties.

Demographics

Kochi has the highest population density in Kerala with 7139 people per km2. , Kochi had a metropolitan area population of 2,117,990. The female-to-male ratio is 1,028:1,000, significantly higher than the all-India average of 933:1,000. Kochi's literacy rate is 97.5%. The female literacy rate lags that of males by 1.1%, amongst the lowest such gaps in India.

Kochi's major religions are Hinduism, Christianity and Islam. Jainism, Judaism, Sikhism and Buddhism, with smaller followings, are also practised in Kochi. Though 44% practice Hinduism, Christianity's large following (38%) makes Kochi a city with one of the largest Christian populations in India.
The majority of the city's residents are Malayalis. However, there are significant ethnic minority communities including Tamils, Gujaratis, Jews, Anglo-Indians, Sikhs and Konkanis Malayalam is the main language of communication and medium of instruction for primary education, although a number of schools do offer English medium education. The higher education is invariably in English medium, and it is the preferred language in business circles. Tamil and Hindi are widely understood—albeit rarely spoken.

Like other fast-growing cities in the developing world, Kochi suffers from major urbanisation problems. The city was ranked tenth among Indian cities in terms of house-cost and availability, urban household crowding and household incomes.

The government has plans to make the city slum-free by 2016. According to the National Crime Records Bureau, the city holds the fourth position in the number of recorded crimes in India. In 2009, the city recorded an average crime rate of 646.3 against the national average of 181.4. But Kochi City Police Commissioner later clarified that this anomaly was due to higher reporting rates of minor crimes in Kochi than in other Indian cities.
The State Crime Records Bureau (SCRB) report gives further credence to this as it finds that Kochi has the fewest crime against women in the state of Kerala.
According to the 2011 CII/Institute of Competitiveness report on Liveability, Kochi stands first in the state, and sixth in the country. Kochi is ranked seventh in the list of the top ten most affluent cities in India by 2009 study by Nielsen Company. Kochi was ranked the fourth cleanest city in India in the Swachch Bharat rankings for cities. It was selected as one of the hundred Indian cities to be developed as a smart city under Prime Minister Narendra Modi flagship Smart Cities Mission.

Culture

As a result of successive waves of migration over the course of several centuries, the population of the city is a mix of people from all parts of Kerala and most of India. The pan-Indian nature is highlighted by the substantial presence of various ethnic communities from different parts of the country.

Kochi has a diverse, multicultural, and secular community consisting of Malayalis, Konkanis, Gujaratis, Bengalis, Marathis, Punjabis, Tamilians, Kannadigas, Biharias, Anglo Indians and a few families of Jews among other denominations. The city once had a large Jewish community, known as the Malabar Yehuden—and now increasingly as Cochin Jews—who figured prominently in Kochi's business and economic strata and owned several Synagogues across Kochi and nearby areas such as Chendamangalam, Paravur or Mala.

Kochi was one among the seven diocese of Syrian Orthodox (Jacobite Syrian Christian Church) in Kerala formed in 1876. The seat of the Bishop is at St George Cathedral, Karingachira. Also At Mary's Cathedral Elamkulam, seat of bishop of Simhasana churches of Jacobites is in the city. The seat of Roman Catholic Cathedral of Kerala's first Archdiocese Archdiocese of Verapoly and the first diocese Diocese of Cochin are located in the city. The Syro-Malabar Church, one of the 22 sui iuris Eastern Catholic Churches and a part of the Saint Thomas Christian community, has its seat at Ernakulam. Appropriate to its multi-ethnic composition, Kochi celebrates traditional Kerala festivals like Onam and Vishu along with North Indian Hindu festivals like Holi with great fervour. Christian and Islamic festivals like Christmas, Easter, Eid ul-Fitr and Milad-e-sherif are also celebrated. A merry making fest called the Cochin Carnival is celebrated at Fort Kochi during the last ten days of December.

The residents of Kochi are known as Kochiites; they are an important part of the South Indian culture. However, the city's culture is rapidly evolving with Kochiites generally becoming more cosmopolitan in their outlook. The people are also increasingly fashion-conscious, often deviating from the traditional Kerala wear to western clothing.

Kochiites generally partake of Keralite cuisine, which is generally characterised by an abundance of coconut and spices. Other South Indian cuisines, as well as Chinese and North Indian cuisines are popular. Fast food culture is also very prominent. Being a tourist hotspot, Fort Kochi have a number of restaurants that offer international cuisine, like Italian, French, Mexican etc. Being close to the ocean and the backwaters, Kochi has an abundance of seafood, which reflects in the cuisine. Cochin is also called the official food capital of Kerala with largest number of restaurants and cafeterias in Kerala that serves every kind of delicious cuisine. A service known as You Buy, We Cook is available at the waterfront of Fort Kochi, where the fresh seafood purchased from the nets is cooked as per the customers needs. Arabian food joints that serve Shawarma and roasted chicken are a new addition to the fast food scene in the city.

Various shopping malls are expected to open in the city in the near future including Forum Thomsun Mall.

Kochi is the official food capital of Kerala because of the highest number of restaurants and the varieties of foods available. Kochi serves every type of food available in Kerala. Its very famous for varieties of non vegetarian food. Kochi also has the most five star hotels in the state. These include international brands like Crowne Plaza, Marriott International, Grand Hyatt, Sheraton, Le Méridien, Radisson Blu, Holiday Inn, Ramada, Ibis, Taj Malabar, The Gateway etc.

Kochi was home to some of the most influential figures in Malayalam literature, including Changampuzha Krishna Pillai, Kesari Balakrishna Pillai, G. Sankara Kurup, and Vyloppilli Sreedhara Menon. Prominent social reformers such as Sahodaran Ayyappan and Pandit Karuppan also are from Kochi. The Kochi International Book Festival is an annual event.

The Maharajas of Kochi (then Cochin) were scholars who knew the epics and encouraged the arts. The paintings at the Hill Palace and the Dutch Palace are testimony to their love for arts.

Kochiites are known for their enthusiasm in sports, especially football and cricket.
The Jawaharlal Nehru International Stadium in Kochi is one of the largest stadiums in India with floodlights for Cricket and Football matches. The Regional Sports Centre is an important centre of sporting activity in the city.
Kochi is reportedly the sixth best city in India according to the livability index of 2011.

Healthcare

With many advanced tertiary/quaternary care facilities, Kochi has one of the best healthcare facilities in India. It is the prime destination for people seeking advanced healthcare facilities from across Kerala.

In recent times, it has attracted many patients from India, the Middle East, Africa, Europe and the United States looking for relatively inexpensive advanced medical care. Kochi is the only city from Kerala that have carried out successful heart transplantations. Amrita Institute of Medical Sciences and Research Centre, Sunrise Hospital, Specialist Hospital, Medical Trust Hospital, PVS Memorial Hospital, Renai Medicity, Lakeshore Hospital, Lisie Hospital, Aster Medcity, Rajagiri Institute of Medical Sciences are some of the advanced tertiary/quaternary healthcare facilities in Kochi. Other reputed institutions in the city include Ernakulam Medical Centre, KIMS Hospital, Gautham Hospital, Lourdes Hospital and Saraf Hospital. Some of the reputed fertility related treatment centres in India – like Vijaya Hospital, Bourn Hall Clinic and CIMAR – are located in Kochi. General Hospital, Ernakulam and Government Medical College, Ernakulam are the notable medical institutions in the government sector in Kochi.

In August 2019, a home daycare program in the district, Arike has started for extending the service of the home palliative care. Nurses who have undergone training in palliative care will be reaching out to patients at home every day on two-wheelers. The service will be available to those who have registered with the General Hospital's home palliative care programme.

Education

Secondary education 
The pattern of primary education is essentially the same all over the state. There are government owned schools and government aided schools, which are affiliated to the Kerala State Education Board. A few privately owned schools are also affiliated to the system. Most of the schools owned by private organisations or individuals are affiliated to the Central Board for Secondary Education (CBSE). Indian Certificate of Secondary Education (ICSE) have some schools affiliated to them as well. The state education board offers both Malayalam and English medium instruction, while the other boards offer English medium alone. There are a few schools that follow international curricula, such as IB and IGCSE.

There 34 government schools, 67 private aided schools and 31 unaided schools affiliated to the Kerala State Education Board in the city and suburbs. There are 62 CBSE Schools, 2 IGCSE and 9 ICSE Schools as well.

The notable schools in the government sector are Sree Rama Varma High School, Edappally High School, Government School-Kochi and Govt Girls Higher Secondary School, Ernakulam. There are Kendriya Vidyalaya, Chinmaya Mission and Bharatiya Vidya Bhavan run several quasi-private charter schools within the city limits, as well as in the suburbs. There are several private schools (both aided & unaided0 that are owned by secular and religious trusts which are of particular renown, such as:St. Albert's HSS, Ernakulam, St. Teresa's CGHSS, St. Mary's CGHSS Ernakulam, St. Antony's CGHSS, Model Technical Higher Secondary School, Kaloor The Delta Study, Rajagiri Public School, Campion School, Assisi Vidyaniketan, Cochin Refineries School, Gregorian Public School, Greets Public School, Toc-H Public School, Navy Children School, Global Public School, Choice School, Vidyodaya School, Mar Thoma Public School, Nava Nirman Public School and St. Pauls International School, Kalamassery, The Charter School Kochi.

Higher education 

The Cochin University of Science and Technology (CUSAT) is a major university named after the city. Most of the colleges in Kochi offering tertiary education are affiliated either with the Mahatma Gandhi University or with the Cochin University. Kochi has one of the campuses of the Indian Maritime University at Willingdon Island. Sree Sankaracharya University of Sanskrit in Kalady is a research-oriented university located at the outskirts. Other national educational institutes include the Central Institute of Fisheries Nautical and Engineering Training, the National University of Advanced Legal Studies, the National Institute of Oceanography and the Central Marine Fisheries Research Institute.

Kochi has some of the leading B-Schools in the region. The Indian Institute of Management Kozhikode (IIMK) has set up its first satellite campus at Athulya building in InfoPark, Kochi. Cochin University's School of Management Studies (SMS) is the first and oldest managerial education institution in South India. SCMS Cochin is one of the emerging B-Schools in the country. Another major B-School XIME is opening a new campus in Kochi. Other leading managerial institutions include Rajagiri Centre for Business Studies, Kochi Business School, Amrita School of Business, Albertian Institute of Management and Toc-H B school.

The city and outskirts are home to four medical schools—Amrita Institute of Medical Sciences and Research Centre at Ponekkara, Cochin Medical College at Kalamassery, Sree Narayana Institute of Medical Sciences, and M.O.S.C. Medical College, Kolenchery. Some of the prestigious general colleges are Maharaja's College, St. Albert's College, St. Teresa's College, Sacred Hearts College, Bharata Matha College, Aquina's College, De Paul Institute of Science & Technology (DIST) and Cochin College. The major Engineering and Technology colleges in the city are School of Engineering CUSAT, SCMS School of Engineering and Technology at Kalamassery, Model Engineering College, Rajagiri School of Engineering & Technology and FISAT (Federal Institute of Science & Technology).

Being the seat of the High Court of Kerala, several top legal education institutes are here. The Government Law College-Ernakulam is one of the oldest law schools in Kerala. The School of Legal Studies (SLS), CUSAT is one of the leading graduate, post-graduate, and research institutes in the country. The National University of Advanced Legal Studies (NUALS) is located in the city, which is a premier law university in India and the only Law college listed in CLAT (Common Law Admission Test) in Kerala.

Social service organisations
Some of the main orphanages and rehabilitation shelters in Cochin City are Palluruthy Relief Settlement in Palluruthy Veli, Don Bosco Sneha Bhavan, Don Bosco Big Boys, Crescent Girls Orphanage, YMCA Boys Home, Bal Bhavan, Valsalya Bhavan.

Palluruthy Relief Settlement is under Kochi Municipal Corporation and managed in association with Peoples Council for Social Justice. There are about 300 inmates and many of them are mentally ill. The night shelter for women run by Kochi Municipal Corporation near Kerala State Road Transport Corporation bus stand provides free and safe accommodation. Peoples Council for Social Justice was found in 1985 under the patronage of Justice V. R. Krishna Iyer with the aim to work for human rights protection, free legal aid and to strive for social justice.

The orphanages for children under Don Bosco Sneha Bhavan Cochi are Sneha Bhavan Annexe, SnehaBhavan, Valsalya Bhavan, Don Bosco and Bosco Nilayam. The Childline India project in Cochin is taken in collaboration with Don Bosco. Children in distress and in need of help can contact in '1098' (toll free number). Sneha Bhavan Annexe is the first point of contact with children and children can stay as a safe night shelter. Sneha Bhavan is a home for the children from the streets and for those from unhealthy and risky situations. The Valsalya Bhavan centre is solely for the girls who are rescued from the streets. Runaways, street children, children of sex workers, abused children and child labourers all live here. Along with primary and high school education at a local school, the centre provides shelter, food, clothing and educational support.

There are also people doing independent social services within the city. The Italian Sister Fabiola conducts a home at Fort Kochi known as "Ashwasa Bhavan", for young orphaned children. Br. Judson run his own "Mobile Bath Service" in his vehicle for the abandoned.

Media

Major Malayalam newspapers published in Kochi include Malayala Manorama, Mathrubhumi, Siraj Daily, Madhyamam, Deshabhimani, Deepika, Kerala Kaumudi, Janmabhumi, etc. Popular English newspapers include The Hindu, The New Indian Express, The Times of India, The Pioneer and The Deccan Chronicle. A number of evening papers are also published from the city. Newspapers in other regional languages like Hindi, Kannada, Tamil and Telugu are also available.

A number of financial publications are also published in the city. These include The Economic Times, Business Line, The Business Standard and The Financial Express.
Prominent magazines and religious publications like the Sathyadeepam, The Week and Vanitha are also published from the city.

Kochi houses several leading Malayalam television channels like Asianet Plus, Flowers, Jeevan TV, Mazhavil Manorama, Kairali We, Manorama News and Reporter TV as well as major news bureaus of Asianet, Kairali TV, Amrita TV and Doordarshan. Prasar Bharati maintains its earth station and broadcasting centre in Kakkanad, Kochi. Satellite television services are available through DD Direct+, Dish TV, Airtel digital TV, Reliance DTH, Sun Direct DTH and Tata Sky. FM radio channels broadcast from Kochi are Rainbow FM (AIR) 101.9 MHz, AIR Kochi 102.3 MHz, Club FM 94.3 MHz, Radio Mango 91.9 MHz, Red FM 93.5 MHz, Radio Mirchi 104.0 MHz.

Kochi is considered to be the hub of the vibrant Malayalam movie industry, especially contemporary Malayalam movies. The rise of Kochi to the centre stage of the entertainment industry occurred coinciding with the economic boom of the last couple of decades. Many movies are shot in Kochi every year. Kochi also has a host of state-of-the-art production and post-production facilities.
Due to these reasons, major section of film personalities including of actors, technical experts and other related workers reside in Kochi.
There are over 50 cinema halls that screen movies in Malayalam, Tamil, English and Hindi. The city hosts Kerala's first cine multiplex, at the Oberon Mall with four screens. Gold Souk Grande also has a cine multiplex operated by Q cinemas with four screens. PVR with 9 screens is another national multiplex brand that has presence in Kochi and is based out of LuLu International Shopping Mall. Cinepolis at Centre Square Mall with 11 screens is the first international megaplex brand in the state. 16 more multiplex screens are expected in the city in the near future.

The district has the largest number of telephone connections in Kerala. Telephony services are provided by various private sector players like Aircel, Airtel, Idea Cellular, Vodafone, Reliance Infocomm, Tata Docomo, Jio, Tata Indicom and the state owned BSNL. All the private sector telecom companies have their headquarters for Kerala circle located in Kochi.

Sports 
Like elsewhere in Kerala, football is arguably the most passionate sport among the locals. In the Indian Super League, Kerala Blasters represents the city as well as the state of Kerala. The Blasters are one of the most widely supported clubs in the country as well as the fifth most followed football club from Asia in the social media. Kochi was also home to the now defunct football clubs FC Kochin and Chirag United Kerala. FC Kochin is considered as the first fully professional football club from India. Kochi was one of the six cities to host the 2017 FIFA U-17 World Cup held in India.

India's fourth largest stadium and third largest cricket stadium, the Jawaharlal Nehru International Stadium located in Kaloor, is a major facility for football and cricket.  Kochi was home to the now defunct Indian Premier League cricket team, Kochi Tuskers which won franchise rights to play in the 2011 edition of IPL.

The Maharaja's Stadium located on MG Road in the heart of the city, is the major athletic facility in the state with synthetic tracks and turf grass as per international standards. The Ambedkar stadium, maintained by GCDA, was developed exclusively for football with funds from Government of Kerala and FIFA. Spanish club Real Madrid has proposed to set up a football school in Kochi.

The Rajiv Gandhi Sports Complex at Kadavanthra is a major indoor stadium, mainly used for conducting badminton, tennis and basketball tournaments. The 25m X 10m swimming pool at the centre is one of the larger water sports facility in the state, where regular swimming competitions and coaching are conducted.

The FACT Grounds at Udyogamandal, Sacred Heart's College Grounds, HMT Grounds at Kalamassery and St. Albert's College Grounds are the other major training facilities for various games like volleyball, badminton, cricket etc.

Kochi has two golf courses in the city, and one in the suburbs. The oldest golf club is located at Bolgatty Palace constructed in 1903, which is a nine-hole facility run by Cochin Golf Club society. The Cochin Golf and Country Club located near to Cochin Airport, operated by CIAL, is Kerala's first 18-hole golf course with a playing area of over 7,200 yards. The first phase of the all-weather golf course comprising nine holes was opened in May 2010 for members and public. The expansion to an 18-hole course is progressing, which is scheduled to be open in September 2012.

Being surrounded by water bodies, the city is ideal for Yachting. The Kerala Yachting Association and the Cochin Yacht Club are located in the city. Both organisations conduct regular yachting tournaments. Kochi was the only Indian city chosen for stopover during the Volvo Ocean Race 2008.

Navy

The Southern Naval Command, one of the three main formations of the Indian Navy has its headquarters in Kochi at INS Venduruthy. It is commanded by the Flag Officer Commanding-in-Chief. The Southern Naval Command consists of Flag Officer Sea Training (FOST), a training squadron, training establishments and bases, and land forces and survey ships. It has a naval air station, and a ship repair yard.

The Indian Navy Day is also celebrated here. It is a week-long event showcasing warships, planes, helicopters etc. of the Indian Navy at INS Venduruthy. It is a public event attended in large numbers.

The close by located Cochin Shipyard Limited is the largest shipbuilding and maintenance facility in India.
Presently it is building the first indigenous aircraft carrier for the Indian Navy.

Sister cities

Kochi is twinned with:
  Norfolk, Virginia, United States
  Menlo Park, California, United States
  Pyatigorsk, Russia

See also
 Neighbourhoods of Kochi
 List of tallest buildings in Kochi
 List of tourist attractions in Kochi
Portuguese Cochin

References

Further reading
 Ma Huan: Ying Yai Sheng Lan, The Overall Survey of the Ocean's Shores, translated by J.V.G. Mills, 1970 Hakluyt Society, reprint 1997, White Lotus Press, .
 Plunkett, R, Cannon, T, Davis, P, Greenway, P & Harding, P (2001), Lonely Planet South India, Lonely Planet, .
 Manorama Yearbook 2003 (English Edition), .
 Robert Charles Bristow. Cochin Saga, Paico Pub. House; 2d ed. edition (1967), .
 Unemployment in Kerala at the turn of the 20th century Insights from the CDS gulf migration studies by K. C. Zachariah, S. Irudaya Rajan.
 Kochi Rajyacharithram by KP Padmanabha Menon. P (1914)
 "Akhilavijnanakosam". Malayalam Encyclopedia. D C Books Multimedia Series.

External links

  (Government of Kerala)
  (Government of India)
 The Story of India: South India, Cochin, BBC

 
Metropolitan cities in India
Cities and towns in Ernakulam district
Former capital cities in India
Former Portuguese colonies
Historic Jewish communities
Populated coastal places in India
Port cities in India